Microsporaceae are a family of green algae in the class Chlorophyceae.

References

Chlorophyceae families
Sphaeropleales
Monogeneric algae families